Štěchovice Reservoir (in Czech Vodní nádrž Štěchovice) is a dam on Vltava River built from 1937 to 1945 as the second stage of the Vltava Cascade. The dam is named after nearby village Štěchovice.

The construction started before World War 2 and because of the need for electricity resources were allocated for the project in spite of general shortage. The power station was put in action in 1943. The reservoir had flooded St John's Rapids (Svatojánské proudy), the most dangerous but romantic part of Vltava.

The main role of the reservoir is to balance the water runoff from peak-load power station at Slapy Dam and to propel two Kaplan turbines with total installed power 2 x 11.25 MW (Štěchovice I). A lock (20.1 m difference between water levels, length 118 m) handles ships with displacement up to 1,000 tons.

The reservoir is also used by the pumped-storage hydroelectric plant Štěchovice II whose upper reservoir was created on the top of hill Homole. The plant was set in operation in 1947 and closed in 1991 due to obsolescence. From 1992 to 1996 a new hydroelectric plant using the reservoirs was built. This plant uses reverse Francis turbine with power 45 MW.

During 2002 floods the turbines of both power plants were severely damaged. After overhaul the plants were put back in production in 2004 and 2005 respectively.

Technical parameters of the reservoir
 height of the dam: 22.5 m
 length of the dam arch: 124 m
 held back water stretches 9.4 km
 reservoir area: 95.7 hectares
 water capacity: 11.2 million m³
 located on 84.4 km of the river

Notes

External links 

 Overview on website of the operator, ČEZ (en, cz, de)
 Overview on website of Vltava River Authority (in Czech)
 Overview on website of Štěchovice village (in Czech)

Reservoirs in the Czech Republic
Hydroelectric power stations in the Czech Republic
Prague-West District
Buildings and structures in the Central Bohemian Region
Dams completed in 1944